An Sgùrr is the highest hill on the Inner Hebridean island of Eigg, Lochaber, Highland, Scotland. It was formed 58.72 ± 0.07 million years ago; the result of one of the last eruptions of a volcano, the core of which now forms the Isle of Rùm. Thick viscous pitchstone lava of rhyodacitic composition flowed out, filling a river valley. The lava cooled and formed column-like structures, similar to those at Giant's Causeway.

The surrounding basalt was softer than the pitchstone, and hence the valley became inverted, with the pitchstone withstanding the erosion far better than the surrounding rock. An Sgùrr is thus an inselberg. The mountain appears most strikingly in the view of the eastern end, known as the Nose of Sgùrr.

The peak is most frequently climbed from the ferry terminal at Galmisdale on the southeast corner of Eigg. A rough track heads west, passing between the northern side of An Sgùrr and the shoreline. About three-quarters of the way along the side of the ridge there is a gully; a fairly easy scramble allows access to the summit ridge. The route now almost doubles back on itself, heading east to reach the summit, which is crowned by a trig point. The climb, from ferry terminal to the Nose of An Sgùrr and back, takes at least 4 hours.

An Sgùrr is also known as the Sgurr of Eigg.

References

External links

Geology of Eigg
 Computer-generated virtual panoramas North South Index

Marilyns of Scotland
Mountains and hills of the Scottish islands
Mountains and hills of Highland (council area)
Volcanic plugs of Scotland
Paleogene volcanism
Eigg